Wolfe County is a county located in the U.S. state of Kentucky. As of the 2020 census, the population was 6,562. Its county seat is Campton. The county is named for Nathaniel Wolfe.

History
Wolfe County was formed on March 5, 1860, from portions of Breathitt County, Morgan County, Owsley County and Powell County. It was named for Nathaneal Wolfe, a member of the legislative assembly.

Campton, the county's seat was reportedly formed from camp town in Wolfe County. A small creek winding through Campton, Swift Creek, is named after Jonathan Swift of the legend of Swift's silver mine. Swift supposedly buried treasure in the area which has never been recovered.

Geography

Adjacent counties
 Menifee County  (north)
 Morgan County  (northeast)
 Magoffin County  (east)
 Breathitt County  (southeast)
 Lee County  (southwest)
 Powell County  (northwest)

National protected area
 Daniel Boone National Forest (part)

State protected area
 Natural Bridge State Resort Park, home to Torrent falls

Demographics

As of the census of 2000, there were 7,065 people, 2,816 households, and 1,976 families residing in the county. The racial makeup of the county was 99.24% White, 0.24% Black or African American, 0.08% Native American, 0.03% Asian, 0.03% Pacific Islander, 0.06% from other races, and 0.33% from two or more races. 0.51% of the population were Hispanic or Latino of any race.

There were 2,816 households, out of which 33.60% had children under the age of 18 living with them, 52.30% were married couples living together, 12.50% had a female householder with no husband present, and 29.80% were non-families. 27.00% of all households were made up of individuals, and 9.70% had someone living alone who was 65 years of age or older. The average household size was 2.45 and the average family size was 2.96.

In the county, the population was spread out, with 25.90% under the age of 18, 9.40% from 18 to 24, 28.50% from 25 to 44, 23.50% from 45 to 64, and 12.70% who were 65 years of age or older. The median age was 36 years. For every 100 females there were 98.50 males. For every 100 females age 18 and over, there were 96.10 males.

The median income for a household in the county was $19,310, and the median income for a family was $23,333. Males had a median income of $23,859 versus $18,952 for females. The per capita income for the county was $10,321. About 29.90% of families and 35.90% of the population were below the poverty line, including 50.20% of those under age 18 and 26.70% of those age 65 or over.

Wolfe County is the poorest county in the United States, by median household income.

Politics
Wolfe County, like most of Eastern Kentucky is historically Democratic. In 2000, George W. Bush narrowly won the county and became the first Republican to do so, but the county still proved its Democratic loyalty by supporting John Kerry by a comfortable margin in the next election. However, the county has indeed drifted away from the Democrats at the presidential level as Mitt Romney won the county 60% to 30% in 2012, and Donald Trump with an even wider margin of 68% to 28%.

Wolfe remained reliably Democratic at the state level for some time after ceasing to favor the Democratic Party at the presidential level; it voted against Matt Bevin in both of his gubernatorial elections, and, along with nearby Elliott County, it was, until 2020, one of only two counties in Kentucky to have voted against Senator Mitch McConnell in each of his elections. In 2020, however, both counties voted for McConnell over his Democratic challenger, Amy McGrath.

Events
The annual Swift Silver Mine Festival is held on Labor Day weekend each year. It includes a parade and vendors in the downtown Campton area.

Communities

City
 Campton (county seat)

Census-designated place
 Hazel Green

Other unincorporated places

Baptist
 Bear Pen
 Bethany
 Flat
 Lee City
 Olivia
 Pence
 Pine Ridge
 Trent

Notable people
 Pete Center, who pitched for the Cleveland Indians in the 1940s.
 Folk artist Edgar Tolson; Ralph Rinzler of the Smithsonian Institution was impressed by Tolson's figures, and included them in the 1971 Festival of American Folklife.
 South Trimble, politician, born near Hazel Green
 Tyler Booth, Country singer, grew up near the city Campton, Kentucky.

See also

 Hazel Green Academy
 National Register of Historic Places listings in Wolfe County, Kentucky
 Red River Gorge

References

 
Kentucky counties
Counties of Appalachia
1860 establishments in Kentucky
Populated places established in 1860